LinQ (pronounced "link") is a Japanese girl group. Their name stands for "Love in Qshu", in reference to their hometown of Fukuoka, on the island of Kyushu.

Members
The members were formerly divided into two groups, Qty and Lady.

Current
Yumi Takaki
Sakura Araki
Rana Kaizuki
Riona Suzumoto
Miyu Kaneko
Riko Ozora
Rei Kuroda
Minami Arimura

Notable Former
Maki Itoh
Manami Sakura
Ayano Yamano
Kana Fukuyama
MYU
Chisa Ando
Asaka Sakai
Maina Kohinata
Chiaki Sara Yoshikawa

Subunit
SRAM was founded in November 2013. This group performs songs in the rock style.

Timeline

Discography

Singles

Digital Singles

Music Cards

Mini-albums

Albums

Compilation albums

Other album appearances

Video works

References

External links
 
LinQ on Oricon 

Japanese girl groups
Japanese pop music groups
Musical groups from Fukuoka Prefecture